The Puerto Rico Public Broadcasting Corporation is the government-owned corporation of Puerto Rico responsible for public broadcasting for the government of Puerto Rico. The Corporation owns and runs several media, including WIPR (AM), WIPR-FM, and WIPR-TV.

Radio stations

Television stations

References

Government-owned corporations of Puerto Rico
Public broadcasting in Puerto Rico